Goof on the Roof is a 1953 short subject directed by Jules White starring American slapstick comedy team The Three Stooges (Moe Howard, Larry Fine and Shemp Howard). It is the 152nd entry in the series released by Columbia Pictures starring the comedians, who released 190 shorts for the studio between 1934 and 1959.

Plot
The Stooges receive news that their roommate and friend Bill (Frank Mitchell) has gotten married. They will soon be moving out of the house so that Bill's new wife can move in. As a favor of gratitude, the Stooges decide to install Bill's brand new television antenna. The project goes into chaos, however, when they eventually destroy the home.

When Bill's new wife (Maxine Gates) comes home to see the mess, all hell breaks loose, and Bill is single as quickly as he had gotten married. In a fit of anger, Bill takes out his aggression on his roommates.

Cast
 Moe Howard as Moe
 Larry Fine as Larry
 Shemp Howard as Shemp
 Frank Mitchell as Bill
 Maxine Gates as Rosebud

Production notes
Goof on the Roof was filmed on November 17–19, 1952. Although the original short is released as full-screen for TV38. It is a remake of 1949's Let Down Your Aerial with Wally Vernon and Eddie Quillan and 1930's Hog Wild with Laurel & Hardy.

This was the last original Stooge short written by Clyde Bruckman. His name would appear in future productions, however, when reworked films featured stories which Bruckman contributed to.

Shemp's mild stroke
Shemp Howard suffered a mild stroke less than two weeks after the filming for Goof on the Roof had been completed. He recovered from it quickly enough by the time production commenced in April 1953 on the Stooges' next film, Income Tax Sappy.

References

External links
 
 
Goof on the Roof at threestooges.net

1953 films
1953 comedy films
American black-and-white films
Films directed by Jules White
The Three Stooges films
Columbia Pictures short films
American comedy short films
1950s English-language films
1950s American films